Onyekachi Apam (born 30 December 1986 in Aba) is a Nigerian former footballer who retired in 2014 after sustaining injuries playing for the Seattle Sounders FC. He represented Nigeria at the 2008 Summer Olympics in Beijing as part of the men's football team.

Career
In 2005, Apam tried out for OGC Nice, where he eventually signed. He made 105 appearances and even extended his contract to end in 2013 rather than 2012 before transferring to Stade Rennes in 2010. Unfortunately, Apam was forced to sit out for the majority of his time as part of Stade Rennes due first to a knee injury and later to an ankle injury. He left Rennes in early 2014 after appearing only 23 times in four years and signed with Seattle Sounders FC in September just before the MLS roster freeze. He was released without making an appearance on 5 December.

Team Nigeria
During his career, Apam represented Nigeria's national team 14 times, including the 2005 FIFA World Youth Championship; the 2008 Africa Cup and the Summer Olympics; and the FIFA World Cup and the Africa Cup of Nations in 2010. Nigeria won a silver medal at the 2008 Olympics.

Personal life
Apam is of Igbo descent.

On 31 December 2007 in Enugu, Apam's car was stolen and he was kidnapped for forty-five minutes before being released.

Apam's nephew Lesley Ugochukwu signed with Stade Rennes, where Apam played from 2010 to 2014.

References

External links
 Onyekachi Apam's profile, stats & pics
 

Living people
Nigerian footballers
People from Aba, Abia
OGC Nice players
Stade Rennais F.C. players
Seattle Sounders FC players
Ligue 1 players
Nigeria international footballers
Nigeria under-20 international footballers
Nigerian expatriate footballers
Expatriate footballers in France
Expatriate soccer players in the United States
Footballers at the 2008 Summer Olympics
Olympic footballers of Nigeria
Olympic silver medalists for Nigeria
2008 Africa Cup of Nations players
Rangers International F.C. players
2010 Africa Cup of Nations players
Pepsi Football Academy players
Olympic medalists in football
Medalists at the 2008 Summer Olympics
Association football defenders
Igbo sportspeople
1986 births